Pachymetana is a genus of moths in the family Lasiocampidae. The genus was erected by Strand in 1912.

Species
Pachymetana argenteoguttata Aurivillius, 1909
Pachymetana baldasseronii Berio, 1937
Pachymetana carnegiei Tams, 1929
Pachymetana custodella Kiriakoff, 1965
Pachymetana custodita Strand, 1912
Pachymetana guttata Aurivillius, 1914
Pachymetana horridula Tams, 1925
Pachymetana joiceyi Tams, 1925
Pachymetana lamborni Aurivillius, 1915
Pachymetana neavei Aurivillius, 1915
Pachymetana niveoplaga Aurivillius, 1900
Pachymetana nyassana Aurivillius, 1909
Pachymetana sanguicincta Aurivillius, 1901

References

Lasiocampidae